Mohan Prasad Baral (born 4 December 1972) is a Nepali politician and the former Member of Parliament. He belongs to Nepali Congress.

References

1972 births
Living people
Nepalese politicians